Qidong railway station may refer to:
Qidong railway station (Hunan)
Qidong railway station (Jiangsu)